Haruhiro (written: 治広, 晴広 or 遥大) is a masculine Japanese given name. Notable people with the name include:

, Japanese baseball player
, Japanese daimyō
, Japanese gymnast

Japanese masculine given names